The 2020 eNASCAR iRacing Pro Invitational Series was the first season of the eNASCAR iRacing Pro Invitational Series, a series of iRacing sim racing events originally organized for NASCAR drivers to compete in after its 2020 seasons were put on hold due to the COVID-19 pandemic. Drivers from all of NASCAR's series competed in races, including Hall of Fame drivers Dale Earnhardt Jr., Bobby Labonte, and Jeff Gordon. Each weekend, the series would race on virtual versions of the racetracks that the NASCAR Cup Series would have raced at that weekend had the real races not been postponed, except for the final race at North Wilkesboro, a former NASCAR track which last hosted a NASCAR race in 1996, to launch the track joining iRacing. The series began at March 22 with a race at the virtual Homestead-Miami Speedway, and concluded with a race at the virtual North Wilkesboro Speedway on May 9.

Originally supposed to be a one-time event, it quickly became a weekly series, and later included the Saturday Night Thunder series of races for drivers in NASCAR's lower series.

Teams and drivers

Main events

Complete schedule

Limited schedule

Notes

Thunder races

Complete schedule

Limited schedule

Notes

Races

Dixie Vodka 150 (Homestead-Miami)
This was the first race of the series. Garrett Smithley won the pole and was passed by William Byron on the first lap, who would go on to lead the most laps in the race. Denny Hamlin passed then-leader Dale Earnhardt Jr. in a photo finish on the final lap to win.

Top ten finishers:

O'Reilly Auto Parts 125 (Texas)

Qualifying race
The qualifying race was held earlier on Sunday, March 29, before the main event. The drivers that advanced to the main event were Alex Labbé, Anthony Alfredo, Ty Majeski, and Rubén García Jr., who finished first through fourth, respectively.

Top ten finishers:

Note: Kaz Grala and Trevor Bayne both used the No. 29 in this race. On the official race results, Bayne was listed as the No. 29A to differentiate the two.

Main event
Timmy Hill won the race after executing a late bump-and-run maneuver on then-leader William Byron.

Top ten finishers:

Food City Showdown (Bristol)

Saturday Night Thunder
After heat races determined a 24 car starting field for the race, Logan Seavey (No. 67), in his first Pro Invitational Series start, won the race after passing Chase Cabre (No. 4) with thirteen laps to go.

Heat Race results:
Drivers listed advanced to the main event.

Last chance qualifying race results:

Top ten finishers (main event):

Note: Kaz Grala and Trevor Bayne both used the No. 29 in this race. On the official race results, Bayne was listed as the No. 29A to differentiate the two.

Main event
Two heat races determined the starting lineup for the main event. William Byron won heat race #1, while John Hunter Nemechek won heat race #2 in a photo finish over Ryan Preece, so they started 1-2 in the race, which they coincidentally also finished 1-2 in. This was Byron's first win in the Pro Invitational Series after having strong runs in the previous two races.

Top ten finishers:

Toyota Owners 150 (Richmond)

Saturday Night Thunder
Similar to the Bristol race, this was the undercard event of the weekend, with drivers from all NASCAR series racing in the event. After the three heat races were held, which in order were won by Landon Cassill (No. 89), Ty Majeski (No. 45), and Josh Berry (No. 88). Justin Allgaier (No. 7) would go on to win the last-chance qualifier. In the race itself, Berry won again. This was his first iRacing Pro Invitational Series start.

Top ten finishers:

Main event
Ryan Preece won the pole and led the race for 59 laps. William Byron dominated again, leading the most laps, and holding off Timmy Hill and Parker Kligerman on the last lap to win his second Pro Invitational race in a row.

Top ten finishers:

Geico 70 (Talladega)

Saturday Night Thunder
This race saw a 51 car entry list, with two heat races determining the starting lineup, and the top 20 finishers in each heat racing in the main event for a field of 40 cars. Kyle Weatherman (No. 54) won Heat #1, which gave him the pole in the main event, and Chase Briscoe (No. 98) won Heat #2.

After multiple big ones during the race, Landon Huffman was able to win after inheriting the lead from Logan Seavey (No. 67) on the last lap after Seavey and some other cars crashed on the frontstretch.

Top ten finishers:

Main event
Alex Bowman won after Ty Dillon spun through the infield on the last lap from the lead. Polesitter Corey LaJoie finished second over third-place Ryan Preece in a photo finish.

Jeff Gordon competed in this race, and was involved in the big one, where his No. 24 flipped into the catchfence. After using his one reset, he was involved in another incident later in the race, which ended his chances of competing for the win as he finished nine laps down in 38th place.  Clint Bowyer, who provided the sim rig Jeff was using, finished 33rd after getting caught up in a last-lap crash (he had also blown an engine while leading, having spent too long behind Bowman who was on the tail end of the lead lap at that time).  The one DNF of the race was Denny Hamlin, who was booted from the race during the caution period for Jeff's second crash for a pit lane violation caused in part by his daughter Taylor turning his sim rig's screen off having gotten hold of the remote.

Top ten finishers:

Note: William Byron and Jeff Gordon both used the No. 24 in this race. On the official race results, Gordon was listed as the No. 024 to differentiate the two.

Finish Line 150 (Dover)

Saturday Night Thunder
Like with the previous race, there were four heat races, which in numerical order, were won by Josh Berry, Anthony Alfredo, Ty Majeski, and Kaz Grala. After that, two last-chance qualifying races were held, which were won by GMS Racing teammates Sam Mayer (the first LCQ) and Brett Moffitt (the second LCQ). However, unlike the previous weeks, only the winner of each last chance qualifier advanced to the race.

This week's Saturday Night Thunder was the first to feature Elliott Sadler, who did not qualify his No. 99 into the field as he failed to finish high enough in his qualifying race and also the last chance qualifying race he was in.

Top ten finishers:

Note: Raphaël Lessard and Chase Cabre both used the No. 4 in this race. However, Lessard was listed as the No. 04 on the entry list, broadcast graphics, and official results despite how his paint scheme in the race used just the No. 4 (without the zero in front of it).

Main event
Byron won his third PIS race after passing Timmy Hill for the lead during the last ten laps. Hill would finish third after Christopher Bell passed him for second. This was Bell's first top-10 finish in the series.

Regan Smith, one of Fox's pit reporters who also is a driver, participated in this race. He drove a No. 78 car which was a throwback to his time driving for the former Furniture Row Racing (then a Richard Childress Racing satellite team) team from 2009 to 2012 in the Cup Series (including a win in the 2011 Southern 500). He was involved in a crash during the race and finished 36 laps down in 31st.

Top ten finishers:

Friday Night Thunder (Martinsville)
It was announced on the day of the Dover race that the season finale for the Pro Invitational Series would be at North Wilkesboro Speedway, a track which is currently abandoned, and which NASCAR last raced at in 1996. The race was held on Saturday instead of Sunday so that drivers would not race on Mother's Day as is tradition   in the real Cup Series schedule. For that reason, Saturday Night Thunder became Friday Night Thunder for this week only. That race was held at Martinsville, the track that weekend's real race would have been at, instead of also at North Wilkesboro.

Ty Majeski, who statistically is one of the best drivers in all of iRacing, won this race after having many strong runs in the previous races of the series. Majeski crushed the competition, leading all but one lap in the race. (The lone lap he didn't lead was led by Justin Allgaier.)

Top ten finishers:

North Wilkesboro 160 (North Wilkesboro)
It was announced on the day of the Dover race that the season finale for the Pro Invitational Series would be at North Wilkesboro Speedway, a track which is currently abandoned, and which NASCAR last raced at in 1996, as part of iRacing launching both the 1987 Ford Thunderbird and Chevrolet Monte Carlo Generation 3 cars into the game, and also the track for its servers after research and a track cleanup led by Dale Earnhardt Jr. led to a scan of the circuit that allowed it to be programmed  The race was held on Saturday instead of Sunday so that drivers would not race on Mother's Day, a longstanding tradition with the real Cup Series schedule. For that reason, Saturday Night Thunder became Friday Night Thunder for this week only.

Denny Hamlin bookended the series by winning this race. He inherited the lead from Ross Chastain after spinning him in the last few laps. Coming off a second-place finish at Dover the previous week, Christopher Bell led the most laps in this race.

This was also the first and only PIS race for Martin Truex Jr. In an interview with him during the pre-race show, Truex stated that he was not home over the long break (where his simulator was), and that was why he didn't participate in any races until this one. Bobby Labonte, who drove Truex's normal No. 19 for the whole series until this weekend, still participated in this race, driving a throwback paint scheme, his old No. 018 Interstate Batteries car.

Both RCR cars, the No. 52 and No. 53 Rick Ware cars, Dale Earnhardt Jr.'s No. 8, the Wood Brothers No. 21, as well as Timmy Hill's No. 66 also all ran throwback paint schemes to go with the throwback racetrack. The other throwback scheme was Jeff Gordon's August 2015 Bristol paint scheme, based on the one used from start of his Cup career until 2000. Gordon, the only driver representing Hendrick Motorsports for this round as the four real-life current drivers did not participate, drove in the last real-life Cup Series race at the venue in 1996, which he won.  This was Gordon's second race in the PIS after his first one at Talladega. He finished 18th.

Another noteworthy participant in this race was Jon Wood, a team principal for Wood Brothers Racing who last drove in NASCAR in 2008. He substituted for Matt DiBenedetto in the No. 21, who took off for this race.

In addition to DiBenedetto, Daniel Suárez, Kurt Busch, all Hendrick Motorsports drivers, and all Team Penske drivers did not participate in this race, opting to take a week off to prepare for regular racing to resume the following Sunday with The Real Heroes 400 at Darlington Raceway.

Top ten finishers:

Note: Kyle Busch and Bobby Labonte both used the No. 18 in this race. On the official race results, Labonte was listed as the No. 018 to differentiate the two.

Rule changes
After cars were allowed two resets if they became damaged during the race at Homestead, it was decreased to only one reset allowed for the Texas race.

Not all Cup Series drivers were locked into the main event at Texas, as Joey Gase, Brennan Poole, and J. J. Yeley were placed in the qualifying race and had to attempt to race their way in.

The Saturday Night Thunder race from Bristol used gen-4 (old style) ARCA cars. This changed for the next one of those races at Richmond, where Xfinity Series cars were used.

Media
It was announced that Fox, which normally carries this part of the NASCAR's racing season, would broadcast all iRacing Pro Invitational Series events, which fall in a portion of the timeslots where the actual races would have been at. Fox's booth announcers Mike Joy and Jeff Gordon broadcast from Fox's NASCAR studio in Charlotte, North Carolina (as did then-driver Clint Bowyer, who would join them full-time the following year, for the Talladega race as he provided a sim rig for Gordon), which would also serve as the broadcast headquarters for main booth commentators (who did not travel to the racetracks) when real-life competition resumed.

The Saturday Night Thunder races and the qualifying race for the race at Texas were not televised on Fox and were instead livestreamed on NASCAR's YouTube channel, and the commentators for the eNASCAR Coca-Cola iRacing Series events, play-by-play Evan Posocco, and color commentators Tim Terry and Justin Prince, served as the broadcast team for those races.

Television viewership
903,000 viewers watched the first race at Homestead, while 1,339,000 watched the second race at Texas. These races became the most-watched eSports broadcasts ever.

See also
 2020 NASCAR Cup Series
 2020 NASCAR Xfinity Series
 2020 NASCAR Gander RV & Outdoors Truck Series
 2020 ARCA Menards Series
 2020 ARCA Menards Series East
 2020 ARCA Menards Series West
 2020 NASCAR Whelen Modified Tour
 2020 NASCAR Pinty's Series
 2020 NASCAR Whelen Euro Series
 2020 EuroNASCAR Esports Series

References

External links

2020 in NASCAR